A battle or battaile was a division of a medieval army. The word may be rendered as "battalion", but Abels and Bachrach et al. state this is not accurate because the bataille was a completely ad hoc formation.

In late medieval warfare, field armies were often drawn up into three main battles, also called guards or wards: the vanguard (avant-garde), the middle guard, and the rearguard (arrière-garde), often abbreviated to simply the van, middle, and rear. These terms imply, correctly, that the van preceded the middle, which in turn preceded the rear into battle, if the battles were arranged sequentially as a column. If arranged abreast, the van was on the right, the middle in the center, and the rear on the left.

References

Further reading

(1992) 122 The Army Quarterly and Defence Journal 324 at footnote 2 (West of England Press) Google Books

Jim Bradbury. "Battle" in Routledge Companion to Medieval Warfare. Routledge. 2004. Page 273.
Brian Todd Carey. Warfare in the Medieval World. Pen & Sword Military. 2005. Pen & Sword Digital. 2011. . Chapter 5 at page 80, and "bataille" in glossary at page 133.
Kelly DeVries (ed). Medieval Warfare 1300–1450. Routledge. 2017. (International Library of Essays on Military History). . Page 130.
Stephen Friar. "Captain" in The Sutton Companion to Castles. Sutton. 2003. . Page 46. Google Books
Gary E Sanders. "Through Trial and Error: Learning and Adaptation in the English Tactical System from Bannockburn to Poitiers". Defense Technical Information Center. 2014.
J F Verbruggen. The Art of Warfare in Western Europe During the Middle Ages: From the Eighth Century to 1340. The Boydell Press. Second Edition, Revised and Enlarged, in English. Woodbridge. 1997. . (Warfare in History, volume 3). Pages 75 and 76.

Military units and formations of the Middle Ages